George H. Andrews (September 3, 1821 New York City – November 18, 1885) was an American newspaper editor and politician from New York.

Life
In 1836, he began to work for the Courier and Enquirer, and in 1848 became publisher and associate editor of the paper. In 1854 and 1856, he ran unsuccessfully for Congress. In 1858, he removed to Springfield, Otsego County, New York.

He was a member of the New York State Senate (20th D.) from 1864 to 1867, sitting in the 87th, 88th, 89th and 90th New York State Legislatures.

Afterwards he returned to New York City. He was appointed in 1869 as a City Commissioner of Taxes; was re-appointed under the new City Charter in 1872. He resigned the office on August 26, 1878, to take effect at the end of the month. Later he was vice president of the Mutual Life Insurance Company.

Sources
 The New York Civil List compiled by Franklin Benjamin Hough, Stephen C. Hutchins and Edgar Albert Werner (1870; pg. 443f)
 Life Sketches of the State Officers, Senators, and Members of the Assembly of the State of New York, in 1867 by S. R. Harlow & H. H. Boone (pg. 67ff)
 George H. Andrews Nominated for Police Commissioner in NYT on March 6, 1874
 The Police Commissionership; Mr. Andrews Declines in NYT on March 17, 1874
 Resignation of Mr. Andrews in NYT on August 27, 1878
 Death of Mrs. G. H. Andrews in NYT on November 7, 1880
 Obituary Notes; Mrs. Mary Virginia Andrews Farley (his daughter), in NYT on October 20, 1900

1821 births
1885 deaths
Republican Party New York (state) state senators
People from Springfield, New York
19th-century American newspaper editors
American male journalists
19th-century American male writers
19th-century American politicians
Journalists from New York City